Shangqingsi subdistrict is a subdistrict of Yuzhong District in Chongqing, China.

Administrative subdivisions
Shangqingsi governs the following districts: Guihuayuan Road, Chunsen Road, Xindu Alley, Xuetianwan Bay, Shangdatian Bay, Shangqingsi Road and Zengjiayan.

References

Yuzhong District
Township-level divisions of Chongqing